Zhou Peng (born 12 September 1983 in Linghai, Jinzhou, Liaoning) is a Chinese sprint canoeist. Competing in the late 2000s, he finished seventh in the K-4 1000 m event at the 2008 Summer Olympics in Beijing.

He also won the silver medal in the 200m men's single kayak at the 2010 Asian Games in Guangzhou.

References

 Athlete profile at Sports-Reference.com
 Athlete profile at 2010 Guangzhou Asian Games

1983 births
Canoeists at the 2008 Summer Olympics
Canoeists at the 2012 Summer Olympics
Living people
Olympic canoeists of China
People from Jinzhou
Asian Games medalists in canoeing
Canoeists from Liaoning
Canoeists at the 2006 Asian Games
Canoeists at the 2010 Asian Games
Chinese male canoeists
Medalists at the 2006 Asian Games
Medalists at the 2010 Asian Games
Asian Games silver medalists for China
Asian Games bronze medalists for China